#7 is the sixth studio album by American country music artist George Strait—his seventh album including his Greatest Hits—released on May 14, 1986, by MCA Records. It is certified platinum by the RIAA and it produced two singles: "Nobody in His Right Mind Would've Left Her" (which had previously been recorded by Dean Dillon in 1980), and "It Ain't Cool to Be Crazy About You", both of which reached Number One on the country charts in 1986.  "Deep Water" is a cover of a 1948 Bob Wills and His Texas Playboys song.  "Cow Town" is a cover of a 1962 Webb Pierce song.

Track listing

Personnel
George Strait – lead vocals
Curtis "Mr. Harmony" Young – background vocals
Eddie Bayers – drums
David Hungate – bass guitar
Billy Joe Walker, Jr. – electric guitar, acoustic guitar
Reggie Young – electric guitar
Richard Bennett – electric guitar, acoustic guitar
John Barlow Jarvis – piano
Johnny Gimble – fiddle, mandolin
Paul Franklin – steel guitar

Production
Willie Pevear – recording
Bob Bullock – overdubs
Chuck Ainlay – overdubs
Ron Treat – mixing
Mark J. Coddington – engineer
Keith Odle – engineer
Tim Kish – engineer
Russ Martin – engineer
Peter Nash – photography
Simon Levy – art direction
Camille Brown – design

Charts

Weekly charts

Year-end charts

References

1986 albums
George Strait albums
MCA Records albums
Albums produced by Jimmy Bowen